The Ballard Bridge, also known as the 15th Avenue Bridge, is a double-leaf bascule bridge in Seattle, Washington. It carries 15th Avenue NW over Seattle's Salmon Bay between Ballard to the north and Interbay to the south. The Ballard Bridge follows the Fremont Bridge in the east in the succession of bridges spanning the Lake Washington Ship Canal, which connects Lake Washington in the east to Puget Sound in the west.

The approaches of the bridge were originally timber trestles. It also carried a streetcar. In 1939, the timber approach spans of the Ballard Bridge were replaced as a Public Works Administration project. The deck was surfaced with concrete and the rails for the streetcar were removed. In 1982, it was added to the National Register of Historic Places.

In recent years bicyclists have complained that improvements are needed to address safety concerns.

Gallery

Notes

External links

Seattle Department of Transportation: Ballard Bridge

1917 establishments in Washington (state)
Ballard, Seattle
Bascule bridges in the United States
Bridges completed in 1917
Bridges in Seattle
Drawbridges on the National Register of Historic Places
National Register of Historic Places in Seattle
Road bridges on the National Register of Historic Places in Washington (state)
Towers in Washington (state)